The Danish–Norwegian term Folkeskole ("public school") may refer to any of the following:
 Danish Folkeskole Education, the Danish primary and lower secondary educational system
 Volksschule, a historical primary school system that was in use in Germany
 Folkeskole, the Norwegian historical equivalent of the German system; see Education in Norway
 folkskola, the Swedish historical equivalent of the German system; see Education in Sweden

no:Folkeskole
sv:Folkskola